Karl von Zois zu Laibach (18 November 1756 – 29 October 1799) was a Carniolan amateur botanist and plant collector. Von Zois was described as a "country gentleman". He is best known today as the namesake of zoysiagrass, which was named by Carl Ludwig Willdenow in 1801. The bellflower Campanula zoysii is also named after him.

The Zois family was of Lombard origin; Karl's father was Michelangelo Zois (1694–1777), a merchant who married a Carniolan noblewoman, and was nobilitated in 1739. The family was based in Ljubljana. His brother was the natural scientist and patron of the arts Sigmund Zois.

References

1756 births
1799 deaths
Scientists from Ljubljana
Carniolan botanists